Food Network is an American cable television network.

Food Network may also refer to:

Food Network (Canada)
Food Network (New Zealand)
7food network, an Australian television channel
SBS Food, an Australian television channel, formerly branded Food Network
Food Network Asia, a cable television channel in Asia
Food Network Magazine, published by Hearst Magazines
Food Network (Italy), the Italian version of the channel

See also
Food chain, a concept in ecological science
Carlton Food Network, a defunct British cable television network
Good Food, a defunct British television network merged by Discovery with Food Network UK
Asian Food Network, an Asian pay TV channel formerly known as Asian Food Channel